St. James Anglican Church may refer to:

 St. James Anglican Church (Newport Beach), a parish in the Diocese of Western Anglicans of the Anglican Church in North America
 St. James Anglican Church (Sonora), a California Historical Landmark
 St. James Anglican Church (Vancouver), a church building of the Anglican Church of Canada
 St James Anglican Church, Toowoomba, a heritage-listed church in Queensland, Australia
 St James Parish Hall, Toowoomba, its heritage-listed parish hall
St James' Church, Sydney, a heritage-listed Anglican Church in New South Wales, Australia

See also

 St. James the Apostle Anglican Church